Vadakkekad, Kerala, India, is located in the Thrissur district (South India). With a population of over 21,000 people, it consists of many attractions and services, including more than two government Higher Secondary schools, two English Medium Schools (ICA & Rahmath), and one College (ICA). Apart from schools, many private education centres like Bright Education Centre, Talent Education Centre, and Akshara are playing major roles in the education sector. The main income is from GCC countries flowing to this village. 

Congress & Communist Parties are the most influential political parties. Vadakkekad panchayath is one of the best Panchayaths in Kerala. Many more like ESA Vadakkekad club (ESA Vadakkekad has its own sports team in Kerala as well as UAE, it is located in the heart of Vadakkekad and it has its own football ground in Erinjippadi), Vadakkekad is one of the touristic and wealthiest village in Thrissur. The village is famous for the factory of K.P. Namboodiris Ayurvedic Tooth Powder, which has spread its brands globally. 

Sri. M. P. Bhatathirippad or Premji, a social reformer, cultural leader, and national award-winning actor is from Vadakkekkad. A lot of other social reformers like Sri. M.R. Bhatathirippad and Sri V.K. Sreeraman also come from Vadakkekad.  

The biggest primary health centre in India is located in the centre of Vadakkekad.

Vadakkekad has located 30 km away from Thrissur railway station, 10  km away from Guruvayoor Railway station and 9  km from Kunnamkulam bus stand.

See also
Manikandeswaram Uma Maheswara temple

References

External links
 Website of Vadakkekad 

Villages in Thrissur district